Tricked is a Canadian television series that originally premiered on YTV in September 2016 and BYUtv in October 2016. Starring magician and YouTube personality Eric Leclerc, the series features Leclerc performing magic tricks as hidden-camera pranks. In addition to BYUtv the series has also aired in the US on Universal Kids. 

During season 1 YTV helped produce the episodes in conjunction with ITV Studios. For season 2 YTV was replaced in the credits by BYUtv. Season 2 also saw a shift from occurring in Canada to occurring in New York City.

The series is based on Ben Hanlin's British television program Tricked, which premiered in 2013.

Episodes

Season One
Season Two
On September 8, 2018 Tricked announced on their Facebook page that season 2 would premiere on BYUtv October 8, 2018. For season 2 YTV is removed from the production credits and is replaced by BYUtv. 
<onlyinclude>

Season Three

References

2010s Canadian comedy television series
2016 Canadian television series debuts
2016 Canadian television series endings
Canadian television magic shows
English-language television shows
Hidden camera television series
Television series by Force Four Entertainment
YTV (Canadian TV channel) original programming
BYU TV original programming